Gasteranthus ternatus is a species of plant in the family Gesneriaceae. It is endemic to Ecuador.  Its natural habitat is subtropical or tropical moist montane forests.

References

Endemic flora of Ecuador
ternatus
Endangered plants
Taxonomy articles created by Polbot